Maryana Ivanishyn (born 24 August 1992) is a Ukrainian footballer who plays as a defender and has appeared for the Ukraine women's national team.

Career
Ivanishyn has been capped for the Ukraine national team, appearing for the team during the 2019 FIFA Women's World Cup qualifying cycle.

References

External links
 
 
 

1992 births
Living people
Sportspeople from Ivano-Frankivsk
Ukrainian women's footballers
Ukraine women's international footballers
Women's association football defenders
Women's association football midfielders
AC Sparta Praha (women) players
Expatriate women's footballers in the Czech Republic
Ukrainian expatriate sportspeople in Poland
Ukrainian expatriate sportspeople in the Czech Republic
Ukrainian expatriate sportspeople in Belarus
Ukrainian expatriate sportspeople in Israel
Czech Women's First League players